Shikha Sharma (born 19 November 1958) is an Indian economist and banker, and from 2009 to 2018 was the managing director and CEO of Axis Bank, the third largest private sector bank in India. Sharma joined Axis Bank in 2009 and focused on strengthening its retail lending franchise, enlarging its investment banking and advisory capabilities and developing a comprehensive portfolio of products.

Early life and education

Daughter of an Indian Army officer, Shikha was born on 19 November 1958. As her father was an army man, the Sharma family travelled all over the country and Shikha attended seven schools in as many cities before finishing her schooling from Loreto Convent in Delhi. She went on to do BA (Honours) in Economics from the Lady Shri Ram College for Women (LSR) in Delhi and MBA from IIM Ahmedabad. She also holds a post-graduate diploma in Software Technology from the National Centre for Software Technology in Mumbai.

According to a Business Standard report, "Physics was her first choice for an undergraduate course but she settled for economics because the former was not offered by LSR. But she has no regrets as economics gave her enough opportunity to prove her formidable skills in maths — a subject very close to her heart."

Family

Sharma is married to Sanjaya Sharma, her batch-mate at IIM-A. Sanjaya is the former CEO of Tata Interactive Systems. The couple have two children, Tilak and Tvisha. Sharma has two younger brothers who are cardiologists.

Career

Sharma has more than three decades of experience in the financial sector having begun her career with ICICI Bank in 1980. In her 29-year tenure with the ICICI group, Sharma was instrumental in setting up ICICI Securities – a joint venture between ICICI and J.P. Morgan, besides setting up various group businesses for ICICI, including investment banking and retail finance. In her last assignment at ICICI, as Managing Director & CEO of ICICI Prudential Life Insurance Company, she built and contributed remarkably to make it the number 1 private sector Life Insurance Company in India.

Achievements

Since Sharma's appointment as MD & CEO of Axis Bank in 2009, the bank's stock has gained over 90%. After one and half year of her appointment as MD & CEO Axis Bank acquired Enam Securities.  The bank's compounded annual net profit growth rate was above 20 per cent in the three years ending 2014-15. The bank's net non-performing asset ratio was 1.34 per cent as of March 2015, much lower than the 4.4 per cent for the banking sector as a whole. Net profit in 2015-16 rose 18.3 per cent to Rs 7,358 crore, operating profit was up 24 per cent at Rs 3,582 crore, while net interest income grew 19 per cent to Rs 14,224 crore. Advances grew 22 per cent and deposits were up 15 per cent during the year, both higher than the industry. The share of low-cost current account savings account (CASA) deposits remained stable at 45 per cent, a high ratio. The Bank continued its international expansion during the year and opened a Representative Office in Dhaka.

Under Sharma's leadership, Axis Bank has received many awards notably, "Bank of the Year in India" for 2014 from The Banker magazine, Financial Times. A "Certificate of Recognition for excellence in Corporate Governance" from the Institute of Company Secretaries of India (ICSI), for 2015. It was ranked the "Most Trusted Private Sector Bank" for the second year in a row - 'Most Trusted Brand Survey', conducted by Brand Equity, Economic Times. Axis Bank was ranked "No 1 company to work for in the BFSI sector" in the "Best Companies to Work for" survey by Business Today in 2013. Harvard Business Review published a case study on "Managing Change at Axis Bank" in 2013.

Sharma retired on 31 December 2018, and was succeeded by Amitabh Chaudhry as MD and CEO.

Awards and recognition
 'Banker of the Year' for 2014-15 by Business Standard 
 AIMA - JRD Tata Corporate Leadership Award for the Year 2014 
 'India's Best Woman CEO' by Business Today- 2013 
 'Transformational Business Leader of the Year’ at AIMA's Managing India Awards – 2012 
 Woman Leader of the year’ at Bloomberg - UTV Financial Leadership Awards – 2012 
 Businessworld's Banker of the Year Award - 2012
 Forbes List of Asia's 50 Power Business Women - 2012
 Indian Express Most Powerful Indians – 2012
 India Today Power List of 25 Most Influential Women - 2012
 Finance Asia's Top 20 Women in Finance - 2011
 Business Today ‘Hall of Fame' – 2011
 Fortune Global and India list of 50 Most Powerful Women in Business – 2011
 Businesswoman of the Year at the Economic Times Awards – 2008
 Entrepreneur of the Year – Manager at the E&Y Entrepreneur Awards - 2007
 Outstanding Businesswoman of the Year, CNBC TV 18's Business Leader Awards

References

External links
 Axis Bank board of directors

Indian women bankers
Living people
Indian women chief executives
Indian Institute of Management Ahmedabad alumni
1958 births
Businesspeople from Delhi
Businesswomen from Delhi
20th-century Indian businesswomen
20th-century Indian businesspeople
21st-century Indian businesswomen
21st-century Indian businesspeople
Axis Bank